J. C. Séamus Davis is an Irish physicist whose research explores the world of macroscopic quantum physics. Davis concentrates upon the fundamental physics of exotic states of electronic, magnetic, atomic and space-time quantum matter. A specialty is development of innovative instrumentation to allow direct atomic-scale visualization or perception of the quantum many-body phenomena that are characteristic of these states.

Davis operates three suites of ultra-low vibration laboratories, one in Beecroft Building at Oxford University (UK), another in the Kane Building at University College Cork (IE) and a third in Clark Hall at Cornell University (US). Other key components of the program are at the Max Planck Inst. for Chemical Physics of Solids  in Dresden (DE).

Biography
Davis was admitted to University College Cork (UCC) in 1978 and studied physics under Frank Fahy, earning a B.Sc. there in 1983. He got a Ph.D. in Physics from the University of California, Berkeley in 1989, became a postdoctoral research associate there in 1990 and joined the faculty in 1993, rising through the ranks to become a full Professor of Physics in 2001. From 1998 to 2003, he was also a Faculty Physicist at Lawrence Berkeley National Laboratory. He then joined Cornell University as a Professor of Physics in 2003, and was appointed J.G. White Distinguished Professor of Physics in 2008. Also in 2007, he became SUPA Distinguished Professor of Physics at the University of St Andrews. He joined Brookhaven National Laboratory in 2007 as a Senior Physicist, and in 2009 was appointed Director of DOE's Center for Emergent Superconductivity, an Energy Frontier Research Center. In 2019 Davis became Emeritus Professor of Physics at Cornell University, NY, USA;  Professor of Quantum Physics at University College Cork, IE; Senior Fellow of Wadham College, Oxford, UK; Professor of Physics at the University of Oxford, UK.

Research
Davis' overall interests focus upon macroscopic quantum physics . Active research subjects include studies of:

 Macroscopic Quantum Mechanics
 Space-time as Quantum Matter
 Quantum Monopole and Spin Liquids
 Correlated High-Tc Superconductors
 Electronic Liquid Crystals,
 Electron-pair Crystals
 Magnetic Topological Insulators, 
 Electron Fluid-flow Visualization

For these studies, a variety of specialized instrumentation has been developed including scanning tunneling microscopes, quantum interferometers, quantum mechanical oscillators and spin noise spectrometers. The overall strategy is to exploit distinct capabilities and facilities so as to conduct scientifically harmonized studies with complementary scientific instruments at all group locations.

Publications representing elements of the active research program can be found at: Davis Group Research

Awards
Davis has been the recipient of

 Outstanding Performance Award of the Berkeley National Lab. (2001)  
 Science and Technology Award of Brookhaven National Lab. (2013)
 London Prize (2005) for research on macroscopic quantum physics of superfluids, 
 Kamerlingh-Onnes Prize (2009) for research on high temperature superconductivity, 
 Science Foundation Ireland Medal of Science (2016) 
 Lounasmaa Prize (2020) for pioneering research into visualizing electronic quantum matter 
 Buckley Prize (2023) for innovative visualization of complex quantum states of matter 

In 2014 he received an Honorary Doctorate (D.Sc.) from National University of Ireland. In 2019 he was awarded a Science Foundation Ireland Research Professorship, and in 2020 a Royal Society Research Professorship. He is a Fellow of the Institute of Physics (UK), the American Physical Society (USA), the Max Planck Gesellschaft (DE), the Royal Irish Academy (IE), of the American Association for the Advancement of Science., and a Member of the US National Academy of Sciences.

References

External links
 Davis Group
 Davis Group – University of Oxford
 Davis Group – University College Cork
 Davis Group – Cornell University

Year of birth missing (living people)
Living people
Cornell University faculty
21st-century American physicists
Irish physicists
Alumni of University College Cork
Members of the Royal Irish Academy
Members of the United States National Academy of Sciences
University of California, Berkeley alumni
Fellows of the American Physical Society